Desconhecido is a Portuguese word meaning unknown or stranger. It may refer to:

 O Desconhecido, a 1964 film with actor Fernando Torres
 O Desconhecido, a Brazilian RecordTV telenovela
 Tomb of the Unknown Soldier (Portugal), a monument (Portuguese: Túmulo do Soldado Desconhecido)

See also